Jakub Barac (born 4 August 1996) is a professional Czech football player who currently plays for FK Dukla Prague. He played in the Czech First League and the UEFA Europa League for FC Slovan Liberec.

Barac joined Liberec on loan from Varnsdorf in the summer of 2020, and played in the UEFA Europa League, coming on as a substitute in a 5–1 loss against Red Star Belgrade in the group stage.

He made a permanent transfer to Dukla Prague in January 2021, signing a contract until June 2023.

References

External links
 

Czech footballers
1996 births
Living people
Association football midfielders
FC Slovan Liberec players
FK Varnsdorf players
FK Dukla Prague players
Czech First League players
Czech National Football League players